Acanthocheira is a monotypic moth genus belonging to the family Tineidae, in which it is not assigned to a subfamily. The genus was established in 1968 by László Gozmány.

Its sole species, Acanthocheira loxopa, was originally described by Edward Meyrick in 1914, as Amydria loxopa.

Distribution 
Acanthocheira loxopa is known from South Africa, with a type locality in the Eastern Cape province.

Notes

References

Endemic moths of South Africa
Tineidae
Monotypic moth genera
Moths of Africa
Tineidae genera